Conopalpus is a genus of false darkling beetles in the family Melandryidae. There are at least two described species in Conopalpus.

Species
These two species belong to the genus Conopalpus:
 Conopalpus brevicollis Kraatz, 1855 g
 Conopalpus testaceus (Olivier, 1790) g
Data sources: i = ITIS, c = Catalogue of Life, g = GBIF, b = Bugguide.net

References

Further reading

External links

 

Melandryidae